Stachowicz is a Polish surname. The Russian and Belarusian language version is Stakhovich, Ukrainian: Stakhovych

Stachowicz is believed to generally mean family, son, or of bearing to Stanisław/ Stanislav. As the diminutive Stach was commonly used to shorten Stanisław/ Stanislav. The ending -wicz usually implies son of, or clan of.

Notable people with the surname include:

Stachowicz
Damian Stachowicz (1658–1699), Polish composer
Mary Stachowicz (born 1951), American murder victim
Michał Stachowicz (1768–1825), Polish painter and graphic artist
Ray Stachowicz (born 1959), American football player

Stakhovich
Mikhail Aleksandrovich Stakhovich, Russian politician

Polish-language surnames